Miss National Sweetheart is a United States beauty pageant created in 1941 where runners-up from the Miss America state pageants are invited to Hoopeston, Illinois to compete for the title of Miss National Sweetheart, and the name of the title held by the winner of that pageant. 

The event, which has no official ties to the Miss America Organization, is sponsored by the Hoopeston Jaycees and is held on Labor Day weekend in conjunction with the town's revered annual Sweetcorn Festival.  Most contestants placed first runner-up in their state pageant, however second and other runners-up are invited if the first runner-up chooses not to attend.  The winner of the Miss National Sweetheart title receives a $1,200 scholarship and a pendant shaped like an ear of corn.

Winning this title does not guarantee that a contestant will win a Miss America state title, but since 1980, five Miss National Sweetheart winners have gone on to win both their state and the Miss America title.  Since 1970 there have been nine Miss America titleholders who have competed in the National Sweetheart pageant.

In 2016, the Miss America organization officially disassociated itself with the Miss National Sweetheart Organization.  Miss America state pageant contestants were prohibited from competing.

The 2022 National Sweetheart Pageant was held on September 4, 2022.  The current titleholder is Miss Georgia Sweetheart, Savannah Jo Stevens.

Winners

References

External links
Official website
Results through 2015

Beauty pageants in the United States
1941 establishments in the United States
American awards
Miss America
Vermilion County, Illinois
Junior Chamber International